Parallel Creek is a creek in northern British Columbia, Canada. It flows northwest into an expansion of the Jennings River.

References

Rivers of British Columbia
Cassiar Land District